Roberto Badiani (born 9 October 1949) is a retired Italian footballer. He played as midfielder.

References

1949 births
Living people
Italian footballers
Association football midfielders
Serie A players
Serie B players
U.S. Livorno 1915 players
Mantova 1911 players
U.C. Sampdoria players
S.S. Lazio players
S.S.C. Napoli players
U.S. Pistoiese 1921 players